Mildew Wolf is a fictional anthropomorphic wolf, main antagonist, and title character of the Cattanooga Cats segment It's the Wolf!. He is the most popular character of the series, and he was voiced by an uncredited Paul Lynde.

Biography
Mildew's main goal in the segments was to catch a little sheep named Lambsy, but he was always thwarted by Lambsy's sheep dog Bristle Hound.

Other appearances
In 1977–78, Mildew became a co-host (with Snagglepuss) on the Laff-A-Lympics segments of Scooby's All-Star Laff-A-Lympics / Scooby's All-Stars. He was voiced by John Stephenson.

Mildew Wolf appeared in A Yabba-Dabba-Doo Celebration! 50 Years of Hanna-Barbera.

Mildew Wolf appears in Jellystone!, voiced by Bernardo de Paula. Possibly in reference to Paul Lynde's campy, barely closeted Hollywood persona, he is depicted as being gay, momentarily flirting with his co-worker Shazzan.

References

Fictional anthropomorphic characters
Fictional wolves
Fictional con artists
Hanna-Barbera characters
Television characters introduced in 1969